Niels Finn Høffding (10 March 1899 in Copenhagen – 29 March 1997 in Copenhagen) was a Danish composer. Høffding studied composition under Knud Jeppesen and Thomas Laub, and then under Joseph Marx in Vienna from 1921-22. His works first became well known in Denmark in the 1920s, particularly the piece Karlsvognen (chorus and orchestra, 1924). He began to study folk music about 1930, and founded the Copenhagen School of Folk Music in 1931. From 1931 he also taught at the Royal Danish Academy of Music, where he served as director after 1954. In 1956 and 1958 he was awarded the Nielsen Prize. His pupils include Pelle Gudmundsen-Holmgreen, Vagn Holmboe, Bent Lorentzen, and Leif Thybo. 

In addition to composing, Høffding also wrote several theoretical treatises.

Works
Note:This list is incomplete

Opera 
Kejserens nye klæder (1928)
Kilderejsen op. 15 (1942)

Choral 
 4 DIAPSALMATA (Søren Kierkegaard words, four diapsalmata (aphorism) from Either/Or vol. I. 1977
Karlsvognen (chorus and orchestra, 1924)
Christofer Columbus (1937)
Kantate til Det Kongelige Danske Musikkonservatoriums årsfest (1948)
Giordano Bruno (1968)

Orchestral 
Romance for Violin and String orchestra (1918)
Concerto grosso (strings, piano and harp – 1920)
Symphony No. 1 "Sinfonia impetuosa" op. 3 (1923)
Symphony No. 2 "Il canto liberato" op. 5 (1924)
Suite from Kejserens nye klæder (The Emperor’s New Clothes) op. 9 (1927)
Symphony No. 3 op. 12 (1928)
Overture for small orchestra (1930)
Overture for amateur orchestra op. 18 (1931)
Concerto for oboe and string orchestra (1933)
Symphony No. 4 "Sinfonia concertante" for piano, wind quintet and string orchestra op. 25 (1934)
Evolution, Symphonic Fantasy No. 1 (1939)
Fanfare, concert piece for orchestra (1939)
Det er ganske vist, Symphonic Fantasy No. 2 (1940)
Fire minespil, suite for orchestra (1944)
Majfest, Fantasy on Danish folk dances (orchestra 1945)
Fantasia concertante op. 67(1965)

Chamber music 
String Quartet No. 1 op. 2 (1920)
String Quartet No. 2  op. 6 (1925)
Chamber piece for soprano, oboe and piano (1927)
Dialoger for oboe and clarinet op. 10 (1927)
Wind Quintet  op. 36(1940)
Sonata for oboe and piano (1943)
Familien Vind, quintet for flute, oboe, clarinet, horn and bassoon op. 53 (1954)

Piano 
 Syv lette klaverstykker (Seven light piano pieces) op. 15 (1931)
 Tre lettere klaverstykker (Three lighter piano pieces) op. 16 (1931)
 Sonatine in C (piano 1951)
 7 små episoder for piano 4 hands (piano 1951)
 20 små episoder for piano (1954)
 Kanon for piano (1959)
 Fem klaverstykker (five piano pieces) (1965)

References

Further reading
 Jens Staubrand, Kierkegaard International Bibliography Music Works and Plays, Copenhagen 2009. In English and Danish. 
Don Randel, The Harvard Biographical Dictionary of Music, Harvard, 1996, pp. 385–386. .

Danish classical composers
Danish male classical composers
20th-century classical composers
1899 births
1997 deaths
Academic staff of the Royal Danish Academy of Music
Danish opera composers
Male opera composers
Pupils of Joseph Marx
20th-century Danish male musicians